The Advisory Circular AC 20-152, Design Assurance Guidance for Airborne Electronic Hardware, identifies the RTCA-published standard DO-254 as defining "an acceptable means, but not the only means" to secure FAA approval of complex custom micro-coded components within aircraft systems with Item Design Assurance Levels (IDAL) of A, B, or C. Specifically excluding COTS microcontrollers,  complex custom micro-coded components include field programmable gate arrays (FPGA), programmable logic devices (PLD), and application-specific integrated circuits (ASIC), particularly in cases where correctness and safety can not be verified with testing alone, necessitating methodical design assurance. Application of DO-254 to IDAL D components is optional.

References

External links  
 AC 20-152, Design Assurance Guidance for Airborne Electronic Hardware

Avionics
Safety
Software requirements
RTCA standards
Computer standards